Stolec  (translation: Stool) is a village in the administrative district of Gmina Ząbkowice Śląskie, within Ząbkowice Śląskie County, Lower Silesian Voivodeship, in south-western Poland. Prior to 1945 it was in Germany.

The village has an approximate population of 1,200.

References

Stolec